Dorton is an unincorporated community and coal town in southern Pike County, Kentucky, United States. Located along U.S. Route 23, also known as Country Music Highway, it lies at 37.27667°N, 82.57917°W at an altitude of 683 feet. It is centered at the confluence of Dorton and Shelby Creeks and the junction of U.S. 23 and KY 610, 13 miles south of Pikeville.

The community was named for William P. Dorton. The post office at Dorton was established July 2, 1872 and John Bumgardner was the first post master.

Dorton Elementary School is located in the community. Dorton High School closed its doors at the conclusion of the 1989–90 school year when it consolidated with neighboring Virgie High School, forming Shelby Valley High School.

Education

Most students residing in Dorton attend:

Dorton Elementary School
Shelby Valley High School

References

Notable Residents

Elisha Justice - 2010 Kentucky "Mr. Basketball". Elisha attended Dorton Elementary School, and later Shelby Valley High School.

Unincorporated communities in Kentucky
Unincorporated communities in Pike County, Kentucky
Coal towns in Kentucky